Palace Bridge (Dvortsoviy Most), a road- and foot-traffic bascule bridge, spans the Neva River in Saint Petersburg between Palace Square and Vasilievsky Island. Like every other Neva bridge (except for Big Obukhovsky Bridge), it is drawn by night, making foot travel between various parts of the city virtually impossible. It was built by the French firm Société de Construction des Batignolles between 1912 and 1916.

The total length of Palace Bridge is 260.1 metres, width is 27.8 metres. It is actually composed of five spans, the southernmost joining Palace Embankment between the Winter Palace and the Admiralty and leading to Palace Square.

History
After Emperor Nicholas I lifted Peter the Great's prohibition to construct bridges across the Neva, a temporary pontoon bridge was set up about 50 metres downstream from the current structure.

In 1862, students protesting for a liberal, progressive, and constitutional government were being beaten by the police on the Neva bridge.  When the Empress, Maria Feodorovna passed by, the crowds cheered.  "They were quite loyal," she said; "they cheered me. Why do you allow the police to treat them so brutally?"

Construction of the cast-iron bridge was started in 1912 to designs by Andrey Pshenitsky, but the work was delayed by World War I and the bridge was not opened to the public until December 23, 1916. The history leading up to the construction of this bridge was tortuous with 54 proposed designs rejected between 1901 and 1911. The design was subject to strict controls so as to prevent the bridge from obstructing the view from Palace Embankment towards Kunstkammer, Imperial Academy of Arts, and other structures on Vasilievsky Island.

During the October Revolution the bridge was singled out as one of the principal sites to be occupied by the insurrectionists in order to control the city, it was taken without any fighting.

A year after its inauguration, the bridge was renamed Republican Bridge, but the original name was restored in 1952. Various improvements and embellishments of the structure continued well into the Soviet times. In 1967, the bridge was repaired. The tramway tracks were removed in 1998.

Drawing mechanism
The engine which opens up 700 ton of each bridge flights consists of motors, huge gears (some of which are still the original ones) and thousand-ton counterweights. The mechanism works reliably, but sometimes small incidents occur. In October 2002 one of the gear teeth broke off: consequently the drawing was halted in the middle, and ship passage was delayed.

See also 
 List of bridges in Saint Petersburg

References

External links

Palace Bridge WebCam
Video "Saint Petersburg, Palace Bridge, aerial video 4k (Ultra HD)"

Bascule bridges
Bridges in Saint Petersburg
Bridges completed in 1916
Cultural heritage monuments of regional significance in Saint Petersburg